Ajtony Ákos (21 July 1944 – 12 February 2017) was a Hungarian equestrian. He competed in the 1972 Summer Olympics.

References

1944 births
2017 deaths
Equestrians at the 1972 Summer Olympics
Hungarian male equestrians
Olympic equestrians of Hungary
Sportspeople from Debrecen